Speiredonia is a genus of moths in the family Erebidae. It was first described by Jacob Hübner in 1823.

Description
Palpi with thickened second joint, reaching vertex of head and third joint of moderate length. Antennae of male with minute fascicules of cilia. Thorax quadrately scaled. Abdomen with dorsal ridges of hair. Tibia slightly hairy, and mid-tibia spineless. Forewings with arched costa towards apex. Cilia crenulate. Hindwings with crenulate cilia as well, but with short cell. Vein 5 from lower angle of cell.

Defensive display

Some of the species, such as Speiredonia spectans, S. cthulhui, S. hogenesi, S. martabanica, S. sandokana, S. alix. S. itynx, S. levis and S. celebensis have a pattern on the wings that while the moth is at rest looks like the 3-dimensional face of a lurking animal with eyes and nostrils. This pattern is more clearly discernible in females and may cause an attacking predator to hesitate or perhaps withdraw.

Species
 Speiredonia alix (Guenée, 1852)
 Speiredonia celebensis Hogenes & Zilli, 2005
 Speiredonia cthulhui Zilli & Holloway, 2005
 Speiredonia cymosema (Hampson, 1926)
 Speiredonia darwiniana Zilli, 2010
 Speiredonia gowa Holloway & Zilli, 2005
 Speiredonia hogenesi Zilli, 2002
 Speiredonia ibanorum Holloway & Zilli, 2005
 Speiredonia inocellata Sugi, 1996
 Speiredonia itynx Fabricius, 1787
 Speiredonia levis Holloway & Zilli, 2005
 Speiredonia martabanica Holloway & Zilli, 2005
 Speiredonia mutabilis Fabricius, 1794
 Speiredonia obscura (Cramer, 1780)
 Speiredonia sandokana Zilli & Holloway, 2005
 Speiredonia simplex Butler, 1877
 Speiredonia spectans (Guenée, 1852) – granny's cloak moth
 Speiredonia strigiformis (Robinson, 1975)
 Speiredonia substruens (Walker, 1858)

References

External links

 
Hulodini
Moth genera